Events from the year 1587 in India.

Events
 Jami Masjid constructed in Hajipur
 Nara Narayan ruler of the Koch Kingdom comes to an end with his death (reigned since 1540)

Births

Deaths
 Nara Narayan, last ruler of the Koch Kingdom dies

See also

 Timeline of Indian history